Lenneborg (formerly named Manisa Bella and Lingediep), is a general cargo vessel, registered in Delfzijl, Netherlands, having previously been registered in Monrovia and Groningen. The ship was built in China, being delivered to her first owners in 2008. It delivers cargo around northern Africa and Europe to as far north as Oulu, Finland.

Description
The ship has three holds with a hatch strength of 2.2 t/m2 and tanktop strength of 15 t/m2. Hold 1 measures 15.2 x 18.9 x 11.2 m, hold 2 measures 15.2 x 29.4 x 9.1 m, and hold 3 measures 15.2 x 27.3 x 9.1 m.

References

Cargo ships
Ships of the Netherlands
2008 ships